Acacia densiflora is a shrub of the genus Acacia and the subgenus Plurinerves that is endemic to an area of south western Australia.

Description
Like most species of Acacia it has phyllodes rather than true leaves. The evergreen, inclined to ascending phyllodes which are straight, flat and linear. Following flowering linear to slightly curves seed pods form that are raised over and constricted between each of the seeds.

Taxonomy
The type specimen was collected from near Kellerberrin in 1897 by R.B.Leake.
This species along with Acacia dissona, Acacia eremophila, Acacia kalgoorliensis, Acacia hadrophylla and others all belong to the Acacia densiflora group of wattles.

Distribution
It is native to an area in the Wheatbelt and Goldfields-Esperance regions of Western Australia where it is found growing in sandy or gravelly sandy soils. The distribution of the bulk of the population the shrub extends from around Wyalkatchem and Chiddarcooping in the north down to around Ongerup and Frank Hann National Park with outlying populations found as far east as Coolgardie as a part of mallee communities.

See also
 List of Acacia species

References

densiflora
Acacias of Western Australia
Plants described in 1912